Qalsata (stones, + , a suffix; Hispanicized spelling ) is a  mountain in the Andes of Bolivia, about  high. It is located in the La Paz Department, Sud Yungas Province, Yanacachi Municipality. Qalsata lies east of the Pirqa Pampa River (Perkha Pampa) which flows to the Unduavi River in the north.

References 

Mountains of La Paz Department (Bolivia)